Fredrik Norén (21 April 1941 – 13 May 2016) was a Swedish jazz drummer and band leader.

Career 
In the 1960s, he was active in the jazz circle "Gyllene Cirkeln" and performed with Ben Webster and Dexter Gordon.
In the 1970s, he worked with Lars Gullin.

With his own F.N. Band (born 1978), he fostered young jazz musicians and released a series of albums, Jazz in Sweden (1980) as the first. Furthermore, he released The Snake (1984), Juan Carlos  (1988) and To Mr J (1990). On his own label he continued with the albums City Sounds (1991), live from the Fasching jazz club in Stockholm, One Day in May (1995) with the jazz singer Lina Nyberg, The pelican (1997), T (1999), FNB Plays (2002), Moon Rush and Live at Glenn Miller Café. The band members has varied, most recently including Lars Ekman on bass, Peter Fredman on alto saxophone Calle Bagge/Jonas Östholm on piano and Nils Janson on trumpet.

With Joakim Milder, Bobo Stenson and Palle Danielsson, he released  Sister Majs Blouse (1993) which gave Grammy – later published  Epilogue  with music of Börje Fredriksson (1998). In trio with Christian Spering and Joakim Milder released the album Association. In a quartet with Bernt Rosengren, Lars Sjösten and Palle Danielsson, he recorded Late Date featuring the music of Lars Gullin. Finally, he released the Sweden Bahia Connection – Coneccão Suecia Bahia  recorded in Brazil by Brazilian musicians (2004).

Honors 
2006: The Lars Gullin Award
2006: Lars Färnlöf Award

Discography

Solo albums 
Fredrik Norén Band
1980: Jazz in Sweden (Caprice Records)
1984: The Snake (Phontastic Records)
2001: Plays (Mirrors)
2003: Moon rush (Mirrors)
1987: Juan Carlos (Mirrors)
1990: To Mr J (Sonet Music)
1992: City Sounds (Mirrors), live at Fasching jazz club in Stockholm
1995: One Day in May (Mirrors), with vocalist Lina Nyberg
1997: The Pelican (Mirrors)
1999: T (Mirrors)
2010: Innside Up (Mirrors)
Other
2006: Sweden Bahia Connection (Mirrors)

Collaborations 
With Staffan Abeleen Quintet
1964: Persepolis (Philips)
1966: Downstream (Philips)
1972: Svit Cachasa (SR Records), with Lars Färnlöf and Radiojazzgruppen
With Lennart Åberg
1996: The Zone (Mirrors)
Live at Glenn Miller Café
With Björn Alke's Quartet
1974: Jazz I Sverige '74 (Caprice)
1976: Fine And Mellow (EMI Sweden)
With Bo Hansson
1977: El-Ahrairah (Charisma), 'Music Inspired by Watership Down'
With Brew Moore and Lars Sjösten Trio
1972: Brew's Stockholm Dew (Sonet)
With "Sister Maj's Blouse", including with Joakim Milder, Bobo Stenson and Palle Danielsson
1993: Sister Maj's Blouse (Mirrors), plays the music of Börje Fredriksson
1998: Epilogue – Plays The Music of Börje Fredriksson (Mirrors)
2006: In Concert (Mirrors)
With Idrees Sulieman
1964: The Camel (Columbia [EMI])
Sivuca with Putte Wickmans Orkester
1968: Sivuca (Interdisc)

References

External links 

Fredrik Noren Band Jazz i Ladan 28.1 2010 on YouTube

1941 births
2016 deaths
Swedish jazz drummers
Musicians from Stockholm
Swedish percussionists
Swedish record producers
Swedish composers
Swedish male composers
Male jazz musicians